Marcel Panen (27 August 1910 – 11 June 1934) was a Belgian weightlifter. He competed in the men's heavyweight event at the 1928 Summer Olympics.

References

1910 births
1934 deaths
Belgian male weightlifters
Olympic weightlifters of Belgium
Weightlifters at the 1928 Summer Olympics
Sportspeople from Ghent
20th-century Belgian people